Ælfwald (Old English: Alfƿold, "elf-ruler," reigned from 713 to 749) was an 8th-century king of East Anglia, an Anglo-Saxon kingdom that today includes the English counties of Norfolk and Suffolk. The last king of the Wuffingas dynasty, Ælfwald succeeded his father Ealdwulf, who had ruled for 49 years. Ælfwald himself ruled for 36 years. Their combined reigns, with barely any record of external military action or internal dynastic strife, represent a long period of peaceful stability for the East Angles. In Ælfwald's time, this was probably owing to a number of factors, including the settled nature of East Anglian ecclesiastical affairs and the prosperity brought through Rhineland commerce with the East Anglian port of Gipeswic (modern Ipswich). The coinage of Anglo-Saxon sceattas expanded in Ælfwald's time: evidence of East Anglian mints, markets, and industry are suggested where concentrations of such coins have been discovered.

After returning from exile, Æthelbald of Mercia succeeded Coelred and afterwards endowed the church at Crowland. Ælfwald's friendly stance towards Æthelbald helped to maintain peaceful relations with his more powerful neighbour. The Life of Guthlac, which includes information about Æthelbald during his period of exile at Crowland, is dedicated to Ælfwald. Later versions of the Life reveal the high quality of written Old English produced in East Anglia during Ælfwald's reign. He was a literate and devoutly Christian king: his letter written to Boniface in around 747 reveals his diplomatic skills and gives a rare glimpse into the life of a ruler who is otherwise shrouded in obscurity.

Pedigree 

The East Anglian pedigree in the Anglian collection brings the descent down to Ælfwald, indicating that it was compiled during his reign, possibly by around 726. Showing Ælfwald as son of Ealdwulf, the pedigree continues back through Ethelric, Eni, Tytla, Wuffa, Wehha, Wilhelm, Hryp, Hrothmund, Trygil, Tyttman and Caser (Caesar) to  Woden. The Historia Brittonum, which was probably compiled in the early 9th century, also has a version (the de ortu regum Estanglorum) in descending order, showing: "Woden genuit ('begat') Casser, who begat Titinon, who begat Trigil, who begat Rodmunt, who begat Rippan, who begat Guillem Guechan. He first ruled in Britain over the race of East Angles. Guecha begat Guffa, who begat Tydil, who begat Ecni, who begat Edric, who begat Aldul, who begat Elric". It is not certain whether the last name, Elric, is a mistake for Ælfwald or is referring to a different individual.

Reign

Accession 

At Ælfwald's accession in 713, Ceolred of Mercia had dominion over both Lindsey and Essex. Ælfwald's sister Ecgburgh was, possibly, the same as abbess Egburg at Repton in Derbyshire and Ælfwald's upbringing was undoubtedly Christian in nature.

The following family tree shows the descendants of Eni, who was the paternal grandfather of Ælfwald. The kings of East Anglia, Kent and Mercia are coloured green, blue and red respectively:

Felix's 'Life of Guthlac'  

Ceolred of Mercia's appropriation of monastic assets during his reign created disaffection amongst the Mercians. He persecuted a distant cousin, Æthelbald, the grandson of Penda's brother Eowa. Æthelbald was driven to take refuge deep in the Fens at Crowland, where Guthlac, another descendant of the Mercian royal house, was living as a hermit. When Guthlac died in 714, Ælfwald's sister Ecgburgh provided a stone coffin for his burial.  Ceolred died in 716, blaspheming and insane, according to his chroniclers. Penda's line became extinct (or disempowered) and Æthelbald emerged as king of Mercia.

Æthelbald lived until 757 and carried Mercian power to a new height. His debt to Crowland was not forgotten: soon after his accession he richly endowed a new church on the site where Guthlac had lived as a hermit. The first Life of Guthlac, written by the monk Felix, appeared soon after Guthlac's death. Nothing is known about Felix, although Bertram Colgrave has observed that he was a good scholar who evidently had access to works by Bede and Aldhelm, to a Life of Saint Fursey and Latin works by Saint Jerome, Saint Athanasius and Gregory the Great. Felix was either an East Anglian or was living in the kingdom when he wrote the book, which was written at the request of Ælfwald. In the Life, Felix portrays Æthelbald's exile at Crowland and asserts Ælfwald's right to rule in East Anglia. Two Old English verse versions of the Life drawn on the work of Felix were written, which show the vigour of vernacular heroic and elegiac modes in Ælfwald's kingdom.

Sam Newton has proposed that the Old English heroic poem Beowulf has its origins in Ælfwald's East Anglia.

The king's bishops 

Æcci held the East Anglian see of Dommoc, following its division in about 673, and during Ealdwulf's reign Æscwulf succeeded Æcci. At the Council of Clofeshoh in 716, Heardred attended as Bishop of Dommoc, while Nothberht was present as Bishop of Elmham, having succeeded Baduwine.

During the 720s, Cuthwine became bishop of Dommoc. Cuthwine was known to Bede and is known to have travelled to Rome, returning with a number of illuminated manuscripts, including Life and Labours of Saint Paul: his library also included Prosper Tiro's Epigrammata and Sedulius' Carmen Pachale. According to Bede, Ealdbeorht I was Bishop of Dommoc and Headulacus Bishop of Elmham in 731, but by 746 or 747, Heardred (II) had replaced Aldberct.

The development of the port at Gipeswic 

Ipswich was the first East Anglian town to be created by the Anglo-Saxons, predating other new towns such as Norwich by a century. Excavation work at Ipswich has revealed that the town expanded out to become  in size during Ælfwald's reign, when it was known as Gipeswic. It is generally considered that Gipeswic, as the trade capital of Ælfwald's kingdom, developed under the king's patronage.

A rectangular grid of streets linked the earlier quayside town northwards to an ancient trackway that ran eastwards. The quay at Gipeswic also continued to develop in a form that was similar to the quayside at Dorestad, south of the continental town of Utrecht, which was perhaps its principal trading partner.  Gipeswic's street grid, parts of which have survived, was subdivided into rectangular plots or insulae and new houses were built directly adjacent to metalled roads. The town's pottery industry, producing what has been known since the 1950s as 'Ipswich ware', gained its full importance at around this time.

The former church dedication to Saint Mildred is one that can be dated to the 740s, when Mildred's relics were translated at Minster-in-Thanet by her successor abbess Eadburh.

Coinage 

The coins of Ælfwald's reign are amongst the earliest that were minted in East Anglia. The coinage of silver pennies known as sceattas expanded in his time and several types are attributed to East Anglian production. Most of them fall into two main groups, known as the 'Q' and 'R' series. Neither group bears a royal name or title and the authority by which they were issued cannot not established. The 'Q' series, which has some Northumbrian affinities, is most densely distributed in western East Anglia, along the Fen edge between the Wash and Cambridge. The R series, with bust and standard, derived from earlier Kentish types, is more densely distributed in central and eastern East Anglia, including the Ipswich area. According to Michael Metcalf, the 'R' series was also East Anglian, being minted at Gipeswic.

Letter to Boniface 

A letter from Ælfwald to Boniface, the leader of the English continental mission, has survived. It was written at some time between 742 and 749 and is one of the few surviving documents from the period that relate the ecclesiastical history of East Anglia.

The letter, which is a response to Boniface who had requested his support, reveals Ælfwald's sound understanding of Latin. Ælfwald's letter reassures Boniface that his name was being remembered by the East Angles: it contains an offer to exchange the names of their dead, so that mutual prayers could be read for them. According to Richard Hoggett, a phrase in the letter, "", has been interpreted incorrectly by historians to imply that there were at the time seven monasteries in Ælfwald's kingdom in which prayers were being read, a theory which has proved difficult for scholars to explain. Hoggett argues that the words in the phrase refer to the number of times that the monks offered praise during the monastic day and not to the number of monasteries then in existence. He points out that this interpretation was published by Haddan and Stubbs as long ago as 1869.

Death 

 
Ælfwald died in 749. It is not known whether he left an immediate heir. After his death, according to mediaeval sources, East Anglia was divided among three kings, under circumstances that are not clear.

Notes

References

Sources

External links 
 
 A translation into both modern and Old English of Felix's Vita Sancti Guthlaci ('Life of St Guthlac') by Charles Goodwin (1848), from the Internet Archive.

East Anglian monarchs
8th-century English monarchs
House of Wuffingas
749 deaths
Year of birth unknown

de:Aelfwald